Dragoș Alexandru Penescu (born 24 February 2000) is a Romanian professional footballer who plays as a central  midfielder.

Playing career
Penescu made his debut in Liga I on 31 May 2019, for FC Botoșani, in a game against Politehnica Iași.

References

External links
 
 
 Dragoș Penescu at lpf.ro

2000 births
Living people
Sportspeople from Ploiești
Romanian footballers
Association football midfielders
FC Petrolul Ploiești players
Liga I players
FC Botoșani players
FC Dinamo București players
Liga II players
CS Sportul Snagov players
FC Universitatea Cluj players